Essence is a global data and measurement-driven full service agency. The agency has 20 offices in 12 countries and a staff of approximately 1,900. Essence manages over $4B in annualized media spend globally, with clients such as Google, The Financial Times, Target, NBCUniversal, BP, FrieslandCampina, L’Oreal and Tesco Mobile. In 2015 Essence became majority owned by WPP, and a part of GroupM, the WPP media investment management operation. Essence specializes in strategy, digital marketing, digital creative, media planning and buying, mobile advertising and analytics.
Kyoko Matsushita has taken over from Christian Juhl as CEO from 1 October 2019, Juhl has moved to be CEO of GroupM.

Corporate history
Essence was founded by Matt Isaacs, Andrew Shebbeare and Andy Bonsall who previously worked together at Accucard, a credit-card company backed by LloydsTSB, where they developed an in-house digital marketing arm called Creative Services.

In 2005 they created their own digital agency in London, Essence, with their first client being Carphone Warehouse boss, Sir Charles Dunstone.

In 2006 Essence was hired by Google for a UK media and creative assignment. Today Essence is the digital media agency of record for Google in EMEA, NA and APAC.

Essence has worked for domestic and international brands including L’Oreal, TalkTalk, eBay, Betfair, Expedia, Barclays, YouTube, Method, DoubleDown Interactive, HP, Viber, Visa and Intuit.

Timeline
 2005: Essence is founded in London
 2010: Essence opens NYC office
 2011: Essence acquires Punktilio in London
 2012: Essence acquires Black Bag Advertising in San Francisco
 2012: Essence acquires Point Reach in Seattle
 2013: Essence opens Singapore office 
 2014: Essence opens Tokyo office
 2015: Essence is bought by WPP Group
 2016: Essence opens offices in Sydney, Chicago, Shanghai and Delhi
 2017: Essence opens offices Los Angeles, Düsseldorf and Seoul
 2018: Essence opens offices in Bengaluru, Jakarta, Melbourne, Mumbai
 2019: Essence named as Mediapost's agency of the year 
 2019: Kyoko Matsushita named as new CEO, Christian Juhl moves to be new GroupM CEO.

References

Mass media companies established in 2005